WFCV (1090 AM) is a radio station located in Fort Wayne, Indiana, United States.  It is one of a network of stations owned and operated by the Bott Broadcasting Company.

WFCV broadcasts a Christian radio format as a member of the Bott Radio Network.  The station was assigned the WFCV call sign by the Federal Communications Commission on May 2, 1980.

The station debuted in 1968 as WFWR with a middle of the road music format, which was changed in 1971 to become the market's first country music station.  Following a sale in 1976, the country format was changed to easy listening music, which continued until 1980, when Bott Broadcasting purchased WFWR and changed the calls to WFCV.

History of frequency
The 1090 kHz frequency in Fort Wayne was previously assigned to WFTW, which was a 1 kW daytime AM station owned by Fort Wayne Broadcasting, Incorporated. It began broadcasting August 10, 1947, with studios in the Purdue University Building, 220 E. Jefferson Street in Fort Wayne.

References

External links
WFCV official website
Bott Radio Network

FCC History Cards for WFCV

FCV
FCV
Allen County, Indiana
Radio stations established in 1968
Moody Radio affiliate stations
Bott Radio Network stations
1968 establishments in Indiana
FCV